Gastrodia tuberculata is a species of plant in the family Orchidaceae. It is endemic to China.

References

tuberculata
Endangered plants
Endemic orchids of China
Taxonomy articles created by Polbot